Jennifer Lynn Wexton (née Tosini; born May 27, 1968) is an American lawyer and politician serving as the United States representative for Virginia's 10th congressional district since 2019. The district is currently anchored in the outer portion of Northern Virginia, and includes all of Fauquier County, Loudoun County, and Rappahannock County, parts of Fairfax County and Prince William County, as well as the independent cities of Manassas and Manassas Park. A member of the Democratic Party, Wexton was a member of the Virginia Senate from 2014 to 2019 representing the 33rd district, which includes parts of Fairfax and Loudoun counties.

In the 2018 election, Wexton defeated Republican incumbent Barbara Comstock with 206,356-160,841, a 12-point margin (56–44%). Some commentators have called her a moderate Democrat.

Early life and education 
Wexton is from Leesburg, Virginia. Her father and mother were senior economists at the United States Department of the Treasury and the Commodity Futures Trading Commission, respectively.

In 1992, Wexton graduated with a Bachelor of Arts degree from the University of Maryland, College Park. She then enrolled at the College of William & Mary's Law School and received a Juris Doctor in 1995. At William & Mary, she was a member of Phi Delta Phi, a legal honor society.

Early career
Wexton was a partner in the Laurel Brigade Law Group. She served as a substitute judge in Loudoun County, Virginia, and from 2001 to 2005 as an Assistant Commonwealth's Attorney.

Wexton successfully prosecuted Clara Jane Schwartz for the murder of her father, Robert Schwartz. She ran for Loudoun County Commonwealth's Attorney in 2011, narrowly losing to Republican incumbent Jim Plowman. She was elected to the Virginia Senate in 2014.

Virginia Senate 
After Mark Herring, who represented the 33rd district in the Virginia Senate, won the 2013 election for attorney general of Virginia, Wexton declared her candidacy in the special election to fill the seat. The district includes northeastern Loudoun County and northwestern Fairfax County. In the Democratic primary, Wexton defeated Herndon Town Councilor Sheila Olem. In a campaign ad Wexton spoke of her experience defending victims of rape and assault and said she would "fight just as hard against tea party Republicans who would take away a woman's health care and her right to choose, even in cases of rape and incest." The Republican Party of Virginia criticized the ad, saying it compared Tea Party activists to rapists; Wexton's campaign denied the comparison. She faced Republican John Whitbeck and Republican-turned-Independent Joe T. May in the January 2014 special election, and won 53%–38%–10%. She took office on January 24, 2014, and was reelected in the November 2015 general election. After being elected to the United States House of Representatives, Wexton resigned her Virginia Senate seat on January 3, 2019.

U.S. House of Representatives

Elections

2018 

In April 2017, Wexton announced that she would run in the Democratic primary for the 10th district. Her state senate district included much of the eastern portion of the congressional district, wrapping around Leesburg and Sterling. In June 2018 she won a six-way primary to become the Democratic nominee. She defeated Alison Friedman, Lindsey Davis Stover, Deep Sran, Dan Helmer, Paul Pelletier, and Julia Biggins in the Democratic primary. In the November general election she defeated Republican incumbent Barbara Comstock with 56% of the vote to Comstock's 44%. Wexton is only the fifth person to represent the district since its creation in 1953, and the second Democrat. The first was Joe Fisher, who served from 1975 to 1981. Her victory resulted in the Democrats holding every seat based in the Washington suburbs.

2020 

Wexton was reelected to a second term in 2020, defeating the Republican nominee, former U.S. Marine Aliscia Andrews.

2022 

Wexton was reelected to a third term in 2022, defeating Republican nominee and U.S. Navy veteran Hung Cao, 52.9% to 47.1%.

Tenure
Shortly after defeating Comstock, Wexton declared her support for D.C. statehood.

Wexton opposed Nancy Pelosi for speaker when running for Congress in 2018, but voted for Pelosi for speaker in 2019.

In May 2019, Wexton called for HUD Secretary Ben Carson's resignation after his House testimony that month.

In July 2019, Wexton visited two mosques in Northern Virginia to hear from Muslim residents after President Trump attacked Somali-born congresswoman Ilhan Omar at a campaign rally. Later that month, she announced her support for voting to impeach Trump over his request that Ukraine announce an investigation into his political rival Joe Biden. On August 23, 2019, Wexton formed a new congressional caucus to examine and promote agritourism, which she believes could bring economic and social benefits to areas like the Loudoun Valley.

In September 2020, Wexton authored the Uyghur Forced Labor Disclosure Act of 2020, a bill to require all publicly traded US companies to disclose whether any of their goods or part of their supply chain can be traced to the use of forced labor by ethnic minorities in Chinese internment camps or factories. The act was a companion bill to the Uyghur Forced Labor Prevention Act, which seeks to keep goods made with forced labor of detained ethnic minorities in China out of the US.

During Donald Trump's presidency, Wexton voted in line with the president's stated position 6.5% of the time. As of December 2021, Wexton had voted in line with Joe Biden's stated political positions 100% of the time.

Committee assignments 

 Committee on Appropriations

Caucus memberships 
 Congressional LGBT Equality Caucus
 New Democrat Coalition
 Congressional Asian Pacific American Caucus

Political positions 
Some commentators have called Wexton a moderate Democrat. She has emphasized her willingness to compromise and work with both Republicans and Democrats.

Economy 
In a 2019 town hall event, Wexton described herself as a capitalist. In 2020, she supported increasing federal spending on infrastructure improvements and subsidies for the US airline industry, which was hit by decreased travel demand during the coronavirus pandemic. She also supports expanding broadband access, particularly in rural areas.

Guns 
Wexton supports a bill to study the utility of credit card transactions as a warning tool for mass shootings. She suggested that "the Second Amendment and gun-violence prevention laws can coexist."

Health care 
Wexton supports a public option for health care, suggesting that it would provide increased competition in areas with fewer private insurance options. She does not support "Medicare for All", a proposal to create a single-payer healthcare system and eliminate private insurance. She supports granting the federal government the ability to negotiate prescription drug prices.

Wexton supports strengthening the Affordable Care Act and opposes the Trump administration's efforts to convince the US Supreme Court to invalidate the law. In a 2020 debate, she argued that striking down the ACA would once again allow insurance companies to impose lifetime health care spending limits.

Immigration 
Wexton supports expanding the federal seasonal agricultural worker visa program and the H-1B visa program.

Labor rights 
Wexton supports making it easier for workers to unionize. She criticized the Trump administration for not enforcing federally mandated workplace protections during the coronavirus pandemic.

LGBT rights 
In January 2019, Wexton hung a transgender pride flag outside her office to show her support for the transgender community. In February 2021, Wexton tweeted in support of Marie Newman, who has a transgender daughter, after Newman received transphobic attacks from Marjorie Taylor Greene for hanging a transgender flag outside her office as the House passed the Equality Act.

Electoral history

Personal life
Wexton married Andrew Wexton in 2001. They have two sons. Wexton is an aunt of a transgender child.

See also
Women in the United States House of Representatives

References

External links

 Congresswoman Jennifer Wexton official U.S. House website
 Campaign website

 

|-

|-

1968 births
21st-century American politicians
American prosecutors
Democratic Party members of the United States House of Representatives from Virginia
Democratic Party Virginia state senators
Female members of the United States House of Representatives
Living people
People from Leesburg, Virginia
University of Maryland, College Park alumni
William & Mary Law School alumni
21st-century American women politicians